KBCN-FM (104.3 FM, "ESPN Arkansas") is a radio station broadcasting a sports format. Licensed to Marshall, Arkansas, United States, the station is currently owned by Pearson Broadcasting of Marshall, Inc.

History
The Federal Communications Commission issued a construction permit for the station on 1982-07-01. The station was assigned call sign KZRO on 1982-08-23, and received its license to cover on 1984-01-17. On 1988-10-15, the station changed its call sign to KSNE and again on 1993-07-01 to KBCN-FM.

On March 1, 2012, KBCN-FM changed their format from country to sports, branded as "ESPN Arkansas" with programming from ESPN Radio.

Previous logo

References

External links

BCN-FM
Sports radio stations in the United States
ESPN Radio stations
Radio stations established in 1984